Intercontinental Broadcasting Corporation (IBC) is a Philippine state broadcaster owned by the Government Communications Group under the Presidential Communications Office (PCO). 

The IBC, along with sister media companies People's Television Network and Philippine Broadcasting Service, form the media arm of the PCO and it is assigned as a secondary state broadcaster that primarily broadcasts education, culture, arts and sports programming. Its studios, offices and broadcast facilities are located at the IBC TV Compound, Lot 3-B, Capitol Hills Drive cor. Zuzuarregui Street, Barangay Matandang Balara, Diliman, Quezon City.

History

The beginnings
Inter-Island Broadcasting Corporation was established in October 1, 1959 when DZTV Channel 13 in Manila aired its test broadcast. On March 1, 1960, at 6:30pm, DZTV-TV 13 was finally launched and it became as the third television station in the country after the monopoly of DZAQ-TV of ABS and DZXL-TV of CBN owned by the Lopez family's Bolinao Electronics Corporation (now ABS-CBN Corporation). Its original location was at the corner of P. Guevara St. (formerly Little Baguio) in San Juan from 1960 to 1978. American businessman Dick Baldwin was the station's first owner and programming consisted of mostly foreign programs from American television network CBS and a few local shows. 

Andrés Soriano, Sr. of San Miguel Corporation acquired the network in 1962. Soriano was also the majority owner of the Radio Mindanao Network (RMN) and The Philippine Herald newspaper. Soriano's combined media interests formed the first tri-media organization in the Philippines. As the television arm of the RMN, it partnered with the RMN radio stations for coverages of the general elections of 1969 and 1971. The station built relay transmitters to bring its programs to viewers in Cebu and Davao, with plans to open more in other cities.

Between 1970 and 1972, IBC launched its color transmission system, Vinta Color, named after the vintas from Zamboanga, becoming the third network in the Philippines to convert to all-color broadcasts, after ABS-CBN and KBS. In September 1972, President Ferdinand Marcos declared martial law at the entire country, forcing all television and radio networks (except KBS which was owned by Roberto Benedicto) to be shut down by the government. A few months later, IBC was allowed by the government to return to the air.

ABS-CBN veteran Ben Aniceto became the station manager of DZTV Channel 13 from 1973 to 1976.

The Benedicto years
On February 1, 1975, the network was acquired by Roberto Benedicto (who also owned Radio Philippines Network and Banahaw Broadcasting Corporation) from the Soriano group due to a constitutional limitation prohibiting the ownership of media by non-Filipinos or by corporations not 100% Filipino owned. The company name was changed to Intercontinental Broadcasting Corporation. IBC would launch an FM station DWKB-FM the same year. Marking the relaunch, the network debuted its vinta logo (which would be used until 1978 in two iterations). In 1976, IBC metamorphosed into one of the country's most-viewed TV networks with its primetime lineup and full-length local and foreign films aired on this channel. This catapulted IBC into the number one slot among the four rival networks and also emphasized it as the birthplace of the golden age of Philippine television, with many top series headlined by hit stars on radio, TV and film. Among its top-rated shows were Metro-Goldwyn-Mayer film series of Tarzan that starred Johnny Weissmuller, showbiz talk shows See-True and Seeing Stars hosted by Inday Badiday and Joe Quirino respectively, and comedy shows Iskul Bukol, Chicks to Chicks, and T.O.D.A.S.: Television's Outrageously Delightful All-Star Show.

Using the new income generated from its programs, the network built and finally moved to its present home at the modern Broadcast City, together with its sister networks RPN and BBC in July 1978. The complex was a  tract located at Capitol Hills, Diliman, Quezon City. At the same time, IBC moved its transmitter to San Francisco del Monte, Quezon City to replace the old transmitter in San Juan. By 1985, however, IBC would become second to RPN, albeit with many local and foreign programs that were popular among viewers.

Post-EDSA Revolution, sequestration, E13, and Pusong Pinoy, Pusong Trese
After the People Power Revolution (also known as the EDSA Revolution) which ousted the dictatorial president Ferdinand Marcos and installed Corazon Aquino as the new president of the Philippines, IBC, with 20 television stations that time, together with RPN and BBC, were sequestered by the Presidential Commission on Good Government for allegedly being part of the crony capitalism under the Marcos regime. A board of administrators was created to run the station.

When it became a state channel, a new logo debuted featuring IBC and 13 on separate circles, a revamp of an earlier logo which debuted in 1978–79. The new slogan "Basta Pinoy sa Trese" was in a circle to commemorate the People Power Revolution.

President Corazon Aquino turned over IBC and RPN to the Government Communications Group and awarded BBC's Channel 2 frequency through an executive order to ABS-CBN. When BBC closed down in March 20, both the IBC and RPN absorbed the majority of its displaced employees, which led to the doubling of the network's expenses, and a three-fold increase in the cost of programming. Line-produced shows and co-production ventures with some big film companies like Viva, Regal, and Seiko were favored, aside from their station-produced programs.

The top-rated shows of IBC were pirated by rival networks; however, it scored a victory when it acquired the then ABS-CBN program Loveli-Ness in 1988, starring Alma Moreno. The cost of programs, talent fees and TV rights increased. IBC could no longer afford to produce its own shows, save for its news and current affairs programming and special events. In 1987, IBC was renamed as E13 and adopted a new slogan, "Life Begins at 13", noted for the butterfly logo in the form of the letter E and the number 13. By then, IBC had struggled to cope with the increased competition from the other networks, particularly from ABS-CBN which skyrocketed to number 1 by 1988.

In 1989, the IBC brand returned after two years. The network adopted a new image in the same year, "Pusong Pinoy, Pusong Trese" (Heart of Filipino, Heart of Thirteen), to recapture the glory days it once had. Despite this, advertising support began to decrease, due to the sequestration, internal problems, and periodic management changes. However, the network once more made history when Nora Aunor's Superstar was relaunched that fall with her transfer to the IBC network as a network talent.

Islands TV-13
Islands Broadcast Corporation under Mr. Alfonso Denoga and Mr. Gil Balaguer took over the management and marketing of IBC 13 (which was branded as Islands TV-13, pronounced on air as "Islands TV one-three") in October 1990, at the time when IBC 13 was last in the ratings. The new logo featured three triangles and a slogan, "The Newest Network", adorned the logo. It was in the later part of its operations that ratings and income suffered due to mismanagement which caused labor unrest. In March 1993, the Makati City RTC issued a court order stopping Islands Broadcast Corporation as the marketing and sales agent of IBC 13 due to unpaid financial obligations to the network as the contract of Islands expired on February 28, 1993.

Return of operations, Pinoy ang Dating and Vintage Television

In October 1992, Islands TV-13 was rebranded back to IBC and became a 100% government-owned station by virtue of a compromise agreement between PCGG and Roberto Benedicto. The management and marketing were returned to IBC's board of directors. The programming remained at a standstill in preparation for the launching of a new image of the station.

On May 27, 1994, IBC launched its new slogan  with a music video featuring Grace Nono. Despite limited resources, programming improved but the battle for audience share continued. Advertisers became more responsive to marketing efforts. The following year, IBC began to broadcast its programs via satellite nationwide. Soon after, IBC landed 4th place in primetime ratings.

In 1996, Vintage Enterprises transferred to IBC as part of the launching of Vintage Television (VTV), a primetime block that aired on IBC with PBA, Blow by Blow and other Vintage Sports-produced programs after moving from another government-owned station, People's Television Network (PTV). The block helped IBC-13 land third in the primetime ratings, mainly credited to the airing of the PBA games. At the same time, IBC also installed a new Harris 60-kilowatt transmitter in San Francisco del Monte for clearer TV reception and utilized the services of the APSTAR 1 Satellite for a broader international reach. Later in the year 2000, Viva Entertainment's subsidiary Viva Television acquired Vintage Enterprises (including VTV on IBC block) and changed its name to Viva TV, a primetime sports and entertainment block on IBC which continued until 2002. Rehabilitation of the transmitter and other technical facilities was initiated in the network's flagship and provincial stations.

On September 2, 2000, IBC was granted a 25-year legislative franchise extension under Republic Act 8954 albeit without President Joseph Estrada's signature as the bill lapsed into law after 30 days of inaction. In the same year, the network scored a major victory with the top-rated Philippine franchise of Who Wants to Be a Millionaire?.

On January 1, 2002, IBC launched its new logo and its new slogan "New Face, New Attitude" with a new station ID.

However, in early 2003, Viva TV on IBC cancelled after Viva decided not to renew their blocktime agreement with IBC due to high blocktime costs and low ratings. Despite this, the grand finals of Star for a Night which saw Sarah Geronimo as its winner; its last Viva TV-produced program was aired on IBC on March 1, 2003, to fulfill the contract.

On December 12, 2003, IBC launched its new logo and its new slogan "Ang Bagong Pilipino" (The New Filipino) with a freestyle station ID.

In late 2007, IBC inked a deal with the Makisig Network, led by Hermie Esguerra, as a primetime block-timer of IBC. However, Makisig Network's programs were not aired due to questions on the propriety of the terms and conditions of the agreement. Said agreement expired in October 2008.

Abandonment and privatization
After four decades of serving the network's dominance and entertainment programing, IBC-13's studios and facilities were abandoned due to negligence and their network's mismanagement. Their studio equipment, cameras, lighting and props were dilapidated and very old. Cash and budgets were cut short and they could not afford to utilize radio and television operations. Their programming and airtime had been lost after a network war in the late 1980s and the 1990s and many employees lost their jobs. The network suffered more than 800 million pesos worth of back wages to its employees, some of whom were very elderly or had worked in the network since the 1980s.

, IBC has 200 employees, 29 of which are talents or employed on a "contractual basis", particularly from the news and public affairs and production. The management tried to revive the ill-fated network, but these plans failed.

There were several plans to sell and privatize IBC and RPN. TV network ABS-CBN was planning to buy the network's blocktime to address signal problems and mimic the former's program, but ABS-CBN could not join the privatization bid due to ownership regulations.

In 2011, IBC entered into a joint venture agreement with Prime Realty, an affiliate of R-II Builders Group of Reghis Romero Jr. The agreement called for the development of 3.5 hectares of Broadcast City. With this joint venture agreement with a private business enterprise, the Aquino administration expressed its desire to privatize both RPN and IBC and retain the People's Television (PTV) as the sole government TV network. It was also announced that conglomerate San Miguel Corporation would join the government-sponsored bidding for the privatization of RPN and IBC.

AKTV, privatization bids and property issues
IBC signed a blocktime agreement with TV5's sports division Sports5 to air live sports coverage via its sports programming block AKTV. It was launched on June 5, 2011, with the AKTV Run held outside SM Mall of Asia in Bay City, Pasay. On the same day, IBC launched a new logo and slogan "Where the Action Is" to reflect the change.

On April 11, 2013, MediaQuest Holdings chairman Manny Pangilinan announced that AKTV will no longer renew the blocktime agreement in May due to high costs and poor ratings, and there have been doubts about the future of the network.

In 2012, pursuant to AO No. 26, IBC handed over its archives to Film Development Council of the Philippines (FDCP) for restoration.

IBC signed a memorandum of agreement with the Asian Television Content Corporation under Engr. Reynaldo Sanchez as the major blocktimer of the station. The TATC @ IBC primetime block with the newest programs premiered on June 2, 2014. However, on August 31, 2014, programs under the ATC @ IBC 13 block suddenly no longer aired on the network, possibly due to poor ratings and a lack of advertisers' support.

PCOO Secretary Herminio Coloma, Jr. said in a Senate budget hearing for the PCOO last September 3, 2014, that the network would be fully privatized before President Aquino stepped down from office in 2016 and kept PTV-4 as the sole government TV network. The privatization process would be managed by the Governance Commission for Government-Owned or -Controlled Corporations through the Development Bank of the Philippines. Business tycoon Manny V. Pangilinan was one of the possible bidders for the privatization in which TV5 (a media company under PLDT's MediaQuest Holdings through ABC Development Corporation). Despite the expiration of the blocktime agreement in 2013 (AKTV), the network is still using IBC's Broadcast City facilities for sports events, including its 2014 FIBA Basketball World Cup coverage. However, MediaQuest also could not join the privatization bid due to ownership rules and regulations, given MediaQuest owns TV5 and AksyonTV (now One Sports).

On June 2, 2015, the Philippine Crusader for Justice (PCJ), led by Joe Villanueva, filed a petition to the Supreme Court of the Philippines to nullify the joint venture agreement between IBC and Primestate/R-II Builders for the development of 3.5 hectares of Broadcast City, after the Office of the Ombudsman found the contract to be disadvantageous to the government. The Ombudsman filed a graft case in 2013 against former IBC executives and Primestate.

In January 2016, President Aquino, through the Governance Commission for Government-owned and -controlled corporation (GCG) approved the planned privatization of IBC. The privatization terms meant the IBC would undergo public bidding with an estimated floor price of 10 billion pesos. The proceeds of the bidding would go to the increase of state-owned PTV-4's capital to upgrade and modernize their broadcast capabilities. The Development Bank of the Philippines would be the financial adviser for the privatization. Incoming PCOO secretary Martin Andanar forwarded the privatization plan to President Rodrigo Duterte's executive secretary Salvador Medialdea. Andanar would also coordinate with the GCG before the start of the bidding.

The privatization process of IBC commenced in October 2016. As of December 2016, five entities had shown their interest to join the bidding process. They were Ramon S. Ang of San Miguel Corporation, and the groups led by former IBC president (and current RMN president and chief executive officer) Eric Canoy, former Ilocos Sur governor Chavit Singson, energy tycoon and Udenna Corporation chairman Dennis Uy (who recently expanded his business through his recent acquisition of ISM Communications Corporation), and William Lima, a businessman from Davao.

In March 2017, IBC operated on a low-powered signal but it continued its broadcast on cable and satellite providers. In October 2017, IBC began its test broadcast on digital terrestrial television.

Relaunch, recent developments, and impending shutdown of operations
In late 2018, IBC began to revitalize its infrastructure and its programming after DOT Undersecretary of Tourism Advocacy and Public Affairs Kat de Castro, appointed as president and chief executive officer of the network, replaced Manolito O. Cruz (who died on October 10 of the same year). By December of the same year, the network transferred its studios and offices to a new building at the corner of Capitol Hills Drive and Zuzuarregui Street, Barangay Matandang Balara, Quezon City (a property beside Broadcast City) to make way for the redevelopment of the Broadcast City property into the Larossa Condominium project of Primehomes Real Estate Development Inc. IBC also upgraded its Roosevelt Avenue analog transmitter for the Mega Manila area.

On February 11, 2019, IBC announced a major revamp of its programming, the first since the ATC@IBC block in 2014. It includes reruns of IBC's old entertainment and cultural shows, the introduction of documentary and current affairs programs airing on sister station People's Television Network, and other entertainment and sports content from SMAC Television Productions and ATC, among others.

IBC also created two new slogans, "Iconic.Bold.Chill" and "Kaibigan Mo!"

In March 2020, IBC announced the suspension of telecasting their selected regular programs, due to then-President Rodrigo Duterte implementing an enhanced community quarantine in Metro Manila and Luzon in line with the COVID-19 pandemic in the Philippines. The network regularly airs the PCOO-produced briefing on the COVID-19 pandemic in the Philippines called Public Briefing: #LagingHandaPH.

In May 2020, PCOO Secretary Martin Andanar announced that the network will be used for airing educational television programs by the Department of Education's DepEd TV programming block on analog free-to-air television. The test broadcasts aired from August 11 until 21, 2020 and again from September 21 until September 25, 2020. Official broadcasts formally started on October 5, 2020, the starting date of classes in public schools throughout the country. However on June 2, 2022, DepEd TV stopped broadcasting on the network following the end of the school year.

On December 2, 2021, Presidential Communications Operations Office, IBC and TAP Digital Media Ventures Corporation announced a deal with the Maharlika Pilipinas Basketball League (MPBL) for IBC to air its games (2021 MPBL Invitational only, as the television coverage was transferred to One PH for the 2022-23 MPBL season).

On March 18, 2022, IBC began to transmit its digital test broadcast on UHF Channel 17 (491.143 MHz) as its permanent frequency assigned by NTC. However, on September 1, 2022, the management of IBC announced that it would possibly cease its operations in 2023 despite their ongoing efforts to improve its programming, citing various reasons including financial difficulties. Retaining employees and the management of the said station demanded that the government give their funds which were supposed to be allocated for them in order to continue its television operations, and to finally give it to the retired employees and staff who were never paid since 2009 up to this day. Department of Budget and Management has alloted 187,189,000 pesos from the 2023 National Budget for the network based on the General Appropriations Act of 2023 to continue its broadcast operations and to give the employees' their salaries.

On the other hand, the legislative franchise of the network will going to expire in September 2025.

On January 31, 2023, the House of Representatives approved IBC's franchise renewal bid for another 25 years.

Programming

IBC stations nationwide

See also
List of Philippine media companies
Philippine television networks
Television channels
People's Television Network
Philippine Broadcasting Service
Radio Philippines Network

References

External links
 
 
 
 

 
Companies based in Quezon City
Entertainment companies established in 1960
Filipino-language television stations
Mass media companies established in 1960
Mass media companies of the Philippines
Philippine radio networks
Television networks in the Philippines
Presidential Communications Group (Philippines)
Publicly funded broadcasters
Television channels and stations established in 1960
Television in Metro Manila
Philippine companies established in 1960